Chinese Taipei competed at the 2014 Summer Youth Olympics, in Nanjing, China from 16 August to 28 August 2014.

Medalists

Archery

Chinese Taipei qualified two archers based on its performance at the 2013 World Archery Youth Championships.

Individual

Team

Athletics

Chinese Taipei qualified 14 athletes.

Qualification Legend: Q=Final A (medal); qB=Final B (non-medal); qC=Final C (non-medal); qD=Final D (non-medal); qE=Final E (non-medal)

Boys
Track & road events

Field Events

Girls
Track & road events

Field events

Badminton

Chinese Taipei qualified two athletes based on the 2 May 2014 BWF Junior World Rankings.

Singles

Doubles

Basketball

Chinese Taipei qualified a girls' team based on the 1 June 2014 FIBA 3x3 National Federation Rankings.

Skills Competition

Girls' Tournament

Roster
 Jou-Chen Huang
 I-Chian Lee
 Pin Lo
 Yi-Ching Su

Group stage

Knockout Stage

Beach volleyball

Chinese Taipei qualified a girls' team by their performance at the AVC Qualification Tournament.

Boxing

Chinese Taipei qualified two boxers based on its performance at the 2014 AIBA Youth World Championships

Girls

Golf

Chinese Taipei qualified one team of two athletes based on the 8 June 2014 IGF Combined World Amateur Golf Rankings.

Individual

Team

Judo

Chinese Taipei qualified two athletes based on its performance at the 2013 Cadet World Judo Championships.

Individual

Team

Sailing

Chinese Taipei was given a reallocation boat based on being a top ranked nation not yet qualified.

Shooting

Chinese Taipei qualified two shooters based on its performance at the 2014 Asian Shooting Championships.

Individual

Team

Swimming

Chinese Taipei qualified four swimmers.

Boys

Girls

Table Tennis

Chinese Taipei qualified two athletes based on its performance at the 2014 World Qualification Event.

Singles

Team

Qualification Legend: Q=Main Bracket (medal); qB=Consolation Bracket (non-medal)

Taekwondo

Chinese Taipei qualified five athletes based on its performance at the Taekwondo Qualification Tournament.

Boys

Girls

Triathlon

Chinese Taipei qualified one athlete based on its performance at the 2014 Asian Youth Olympic Games Qualifier.

Individual

Relay

Weightlifting

Chinese Taipei qualified 1 quota in the boys' and girls' events based on the team ranking after the 2014 Weightlifting Youth & Junior Asian Championships.

Boys

Girls

References

2014 in Taiwanese sport
Nations at the 2014 Summer Youth Olympics
Chinese Taipei at the Youth Olympics